Trafford is a metropolitan borough of Greater Manchester, England, with an estimated population of 235,493 in 2017. The borough was formed in 1974 as a merger of six former districts and part of a seventh. The River Mersey flows through the borough, separating North Trafford from South Trafford, and the historic counties of Lancashire and Cheshire. Trafford is the fifth-most populous district in Greater Manchester.

There is evidence of Neolithic, Bronze Age, and Roman activity in the area, two castles – one of them a Scheduled Ancient Monument – and over 200 listed buildings. In the late 19th century, the population rapidly expanded with the arrival of the railway. Trafford is the home of Altrincham Football Club, Trafford Football Club, Manchester United F.C. and Lancashire County Cricket Club and since 2002 the Imperial War Museum North.

Trafford has a strong economy with low levels of unemployment and contains both Trafford Park industrial estate and the Trafford Centre, a large out-of-town shopping center. Apart from the City of Manchester, Trafford is the only borough in Greater Manchester to be above the national average for weekly income. Socially, the area includes both working class and middle class areas like Bowdon and Hale. In Parliament, Trafford is represented by three constituencies: Stretford and Urmston; Altrincham and Sale West; and Wythenshawe and Sale East, which mainly covers neighbouring Manchester.

History 
The borough was formed on 1 April 1974 under the Local Government Act 1972, covering the area of six former districts which were abolished at the same time, as well as four civil parishes from a seventh abolished district:
Altrincham Municipal Borough
Bowdon Urban District
Carrington‡
Dunham Massey‡
Hale Urban District
Partington‡
Sale Municipal Borough
Stretford Municipal Borough
Urmston Urban District
Warburton‡
‡ Parishes from Bucklow Rural District

Stretford and Urmston had been in the administrative county of Lancashire prior to the 1974 reforms, whilst all the others had been in the administrative county of Cheshire. The new district was awarded borough status from its creation, allowing the chairman of the council to take the title of mayor.

The choice of the name Trafford for the borough was a "compromise between Altrincham, Stretford and Sale", and "seemed to have wide support". A Liberal councillor for the Municipal Borough of Sale suggested "Crossford ... whilst "Watlingford" was suggested by councillors in Hale, after the supposed name of an ancient Roman road in the district. Those names were rejected in favour of Trafford, because of the district's "famous sports venue, a major employer as well as historic associations", referring to Old Trafford (cricket and football), Trafford Park and the de Trafford baronets respectively.

As a place name, Trafford is an Anglo-French version of Stratford, deriving from the Old English words stræt (a street, more specifically a Roman road) and ford (crossing). The Metropolitan Borough of Trafford has existed since 1974, but the area it covers has a long history. Neolithic arrowheads have been discovered in Altrincham and Sale, and there is evidence of Bronze Age habitation in Timperley. Fragments of Roman pottery have been found in Urmston, and Roman coins have been found in Sale. The Roman road between the legionary fortresses at Chester (Deva Victrix) and York (Eboracum) crosses Trafford, passing through Stretford, Sale, and Altrincham. The settlements in Trafford have been based largely around agriculture, although Altrincham was founded as a market town in the mid 13th century. Although the Industrial Revolution affected Trafford, the area did not experience the same rate of growth as the rest of Greater Manchester. A 100% increase in population in the Trafford area between 1841 and 1861 was a direct result of an influx due to the construction of the Manchester, South Junction and Altrincham Railway, which allowed residents to commute more easily from Trafford into Manchester. The area developed its own centres of industry in Broadheath (founded in 1885) and Trafford Park (founded in 1897). They have since declined, although Trafford Park still employs 40–50,000 people. Today, Trafford is mostly a commuter area. The borough was formed on 1 April 1974 by the Local Government Act 1972 as one of the ten metropolitan districts of Greater Manchester.

Geography 
The metropolitan boroughs of the City of Salford and the City of Manchester border Trafford to the north and east respectively; the Cheshire East area of Cheshire lies to the south. The geology of South Trafford is Keuper marl with some Keuper waterstone and sandstone, whilst the geology of North Trafford is Bunter sandstone. The River Mersey runs east to west through the area, separating North Trafford from South Trafford; other rivers in Trafford include the Bollin, the River Irwell, Sinderland Brook, and Crofts Bank Brook. The Bridgewater Canal, opened in 1761 and completed in 1776, follows a course through Trafford roughly north to south and passes through Stretford, Sale, and Altrincham. The Manchester Ship Canal, opened in 1894, forms part of Trafford's northern and western boundaries with Salford.

There are areas of mossland in low-lying areas: Warburton Moss, Dunham Moss, and Hale Moss. Greenspace accounts for 51.8% of Trafford's total area, domestic buildings and gardens comprise 25.6%, the rest is made up of roads and non-domestic buildings.

Localities within the boundaries of Trafford include:

North Trafford: Cornbrook, Davyhulme, Firswood, Flixton, Gorse Hill, Lostock, Old Trafford, Stretford, Trafford Park and Urmston.

South Trafford: Altrincham, Ashton-Upon-Mersey, Bowdon, Broadheath, Brooklands, Carrington, Dunham Massey, Hale, Hale Barns, Oldfield Brow, Partington, Sale, Sale Moor, Timperley, Warburton and West Timperley.

Governance

Representation 
The residents of Trafford Metropolitan Borough are represented in the British Parliament by Members of Parliament (MPs) for three separate parliamentary constituencies. Altrincham and Sale West is represented by Graham Brady MP (Conservative).  Stretford and Urmston is represented by Kate Green MP (Labour). Wythenshawe and Sale East, which also covers parts of the City of Manchester, is represented by Mike Kane MP (Labour).

Council 

In 1974, Trafford Council was created to administer the newly formed Trafford Metropolitan Borough and is headquartered at Trafford Town Hall, which was previously named Stretford Town Hall. On its formation in 1974, the council was controlled by the Conservative Party; the Conservatives have been in control 1973–85, 1988–94, and 2004–2018. The only time the Labour Party was in control was 1996–2002, and 2019 to the present. The rest of the time were periods of no overall control. The council meets to decide policy and allocate budget. Its duties include setting levels of council tax, monitoring the health service in Trafford, providing social care, and funding schools. Cllr Andrew Western is the leader of the council as of 2021, and Cllr Laurence Walsh is the current mayor.

In 2007 the Audit Commission judged Trafford Council to be "improving strongly" in providing services for local people. Overall the council was awarded "three star" status meaning it was "performing well" and "consistently above minimum requirements", similar to 46% of all local authorities. In 2008–09, Trafford council had a budget of £150.5 million. This was collected from council tax (57%) and government grants (43%). The council spent £31.8 million on children and young people's services (21%); £60.1 million on community services and social care (40%); £34.4 million on "prosperity, planning, and development" (23%); and £33.8 million on customer and corporate services (22%).

Civil parishes form the bottom tier of local government; the parish councils are involved in planning, management of town and parish centres, and promoting tourism. In 2001, 8,484 people (4.0% of the borough's population) lived in Trafford's four civil parishes: Carrington, Dunham Massey, Partington, and Warburton. They were all previously part of Bucklow Rural District. A rural district was a type of local government district for the administration of predominantly rural areas. The rest of Trafford is unparished. The unparished areas are: Altrincham (Municipal Borough), Bowdon (Urban District), Hale (Urban District), Sale (Municipal Borough), Stretford (Municipal Borough), and Urmston (Urban District). The status of each area prior to 1974 is shown in brackets. An urban district was a type of local government district which covered an urbanised area.

Following the 2018 local elections, the council, which was previously Conservative-held, came under Labour control in the form of a minority administration supported by the Liberal Democrats in a confidence and supply administration. There were a few shock results, such as in Altrincham (ward), where the Green Party gained seats from the incumbent Conservative councillors. After gaining seats in the 2019 local elections, the Labour Party was in a position to form a majority-controlling administration.

Electoral wards 
There are 21 electoral wards in Trafford, each with 3 councillors, giving a total of 63 councillors with one-third elected three years out of four. In the following table, the populations for each ward are based on 2013 population estimates from the Office for National Statistics.

Coat of arms 

The coat of arms of Trafford Council depicts a griffin on a shield flanked by two unicorns. The line bisecting the shield horizontally symbolises the River Mersey running through Trafford from east to west and the canals in the borough. The white legs of a lion on a red background represent the parts of Trafford previously controlled by the De Massey family, while the red body and head of an eagle on a white background represents the areas of Trafford previously controlled by the De Traffords. Both elements were taken from the coats of arms of the respective families. The fist holding bolts of lightning represents Stretford and the electrical industry; the cog on the arm represents Altrincham's engineering industry. The unicorns stand for Sale and Altrincham. The oak branches represent Urmston and the rural areas of Trafford.

Demography 

At the 2001 UK census, the Metropolitan Borough of Trafford had a total population of 210,145.
Of the 89,313 households in the borough, 36.5% were married couples living together, 31.6% were one-person households, 7.8% were co-habiting couples and 9.7% were lone parents, following a similar trend to the rest of England.

Of those aged 16–74 in Trafford, 24.7% had no academic qualifications, significantly lower than the 28.9% in all of England. 8.2% of Trafford's residents were born outside the United Kingdom, lower than the English average of 9.2%. The largest minority group was Asian, at 4.0% of the population.

In 1841, 12% of Trafford's population was middle class compared to 14% in England and Wales; this increased to 21% in 1931 (15% nationally) and 55% in 2001 (48% nationally). From 1841 to 1951, the working class population of Trafford and across the country was in decline, falling steadily from 43% to 18% (36% to 29% nationally). It has since increased slightly, up to 27% (26% nationwide). The rest of the population was made up of clerical workers and skilled manual workers. In the 2008–2009 financial year, the crime rates in Trafford for violence against a person and sexual offences were below the national averages. However, the rate of robberies and burglaries were above the national average.

Population change 
The table below details the population change since 1801. Although Trafford was formed as a Metropolitan Borough in 1974, figures have been generated by combining data from the towns, villages, and civil parishes that would later be constituent parts of Trafford. The greatest percentage change in the population occurred between 1851 and 1871, and was a result of the construction of the Manchester, South Junction and Altrincham Railway in 1849. The decrease in Trafford's population between 1971 and 2001 mirrors the trend for Greater Manchester, although on a smaller scale; this has been accounted for by the decline of Greater Manchester's industries, particularly those in Manchester and Salford but including those in Trafford, and residents leaving to seek new jobs.

Economy 

Historically, the economy of the Trafford dominated by agriculture. This continued to some extent even during the Industrial Revolution, as the textile industry in Trafford did not develop as quickly or to the same extent as it did in the rest of Greater Manchester. There are only two known 18th-century mill sites in Trafford, compared with 69 known in Tameside and 51 in Manchester. After reaching a high of 43% in 1812, employment in the textile industry in Trafford declined to 12% according to the 1851 census. The textile industry in Trafford could not compete with that in places such as Manchester, Oldham, and Ashton-under-Lyne, partly because of a reluctance to invest in industry on the part of the two main land owners in the area: the Stamfords and the de Traffords.

Trafford Park was founded in 1897, and at its peak in 1945 employed 75,000 people. As well as being the world's first planned industrial estate, it is Europe's largest business park. More than 1,400 companies are within the park, employing between 40,000 and 50,000 people. The Trafford Centre, which opened on 10 September 1998, is North West England's largest indoor shopping complex. The centre has over 30 million visitors annually, and contains 235 stores, 55 restaurants, and the largest Odeon cinema in the UK.

Trafford is a prosperous area, with an average weekly income of £394, and apart from Manchester it is the only borough in Greater Manchester to be above the national average for weekly income and is on average the highest in the county. Media, advertising and public relations have been identified as growth industries in Greater Manchester and are concentrated in Manchester and Trafford. Average house prices in Trafford are the highest out of all the metropolitan boroughs in Greater Manchester, 45% higher than the average for the county.

At the 2001 UK census, Trafford had 151,445 residents aged 16 to 74. 2.5% of these people were students with jobs, 5.7% looking after home or family, 5.4% permanently sick or disabled and 2.8% economically inactive for other reasons. Trafford has a low rate of unemployment (2.7%) compared with Greater Manchester (3.6%) and England as a whole (3.3%). Trafford has the lowest number of unemployment benefit claimants compared to all the other boroughs in Greater Manchester (3.7%).

In 2001, of 99,146 residents of Trafford in employment, the industry of employment was 17.1% property and business services, 16.5% retail and wholesale, 12.3% manufacturing, 11.9% health and social work, 8.2% education, 8.0% transport and communications, 5.9% construction, 5.5% finance, 4.5% public administration and defence, 4.0% hotels and restaurants, 0.8% energy and water supply, 0.6% agriculture, and 4.6% other. This was roughly in line with national figures, except for the proportion of jobs in agriculture which is less than half the national average, reflecting Trafford's suburban nature and its proximity to the centre of Manchester.

A study commissioned by Experian rated Trafford as the strongest and most resilient borough in North West England to dealing with sudden changes in the economy. Trafford's low reliance on vulnerable businesses in the current recession and its high proportion of multinational companies were two factors which give the borough its high ranking.

Culture

Landmarks 

As of March 2007, Trafford has 6 Grade I, 11 Grade II*, and 228 Grade II listed buildings. Trafford has the equal second highest number of Grade I listed buildings out of the districts of Greater Manchester behind Manchester. Most of Trafford's Grade I listed buildings are in the south of the borough: the old Church of St. Werburgh in Warburton; Dunham Massey Hall itself, and the stables and carriage house belonging to the hall; Royd House in Hale; and the Church of All Saints in Urmston in the north of the borough. Trafford has three of Greater Manchester's 21 Sites of Special Scientific Interest. Brookheys Covert is a semi-natural wood consisting mainly of ash, birch, and rowan, with a wetland habitat covering  in Dunham Massey. Cotteril Clough is an area of woodland that is among the most diverse in Greater Manchester. Tourist attractions in Trafford include Old Trafford football ground and Old Trafford Cricket Ground.

Chill Factore is an indoor ski slope in Trafford Park.

Dunham Massey Hall and Park is an 18th-century hall with a  deer park, both now owned by the National Trust and previously owned by the Earls of Stamford. The hall is early Georgian in style. The hall and grounds are open to the public and are a popular tourist attraction, with nearly 200,000 visitors in 2010.

Imperial War Museum North is a war museum in Trafford Park and was opened in 2002. The museum won the 2003 British Construction Industry Building Award, and the title of Large Visitor Attraction of the Year at the 2006 Manchester Tourism Awards.

Sale Water Park is a  area of countryside and parkland including a  artificial lake created when the M60 motorway was built. The water park is the site of the Broad Ees Dole wildlife refuge, a Local Nature Reserve that provides a home for migratory birds.

Timperley Old Hall is a medieval moated site in Timperley near Altrincham Municipal Golf Course. Excavation on the site over a period of 18 years has shown Timperley to be inhabited since the Bronze Age. A grant from the Heritage Lottery Fund has been made to develop the site into a community project.

Trafford has two medieval castles. Dunham Castle is an early medieval castle in Dunham Massey. It belonged to Hamon de Massey, and was probably still standing in the early 14th century. The bailey was landscaped into the grounds of Dunham Massey Hall and its moat turned into an ornamental pond. Watch Hill Castle is an early medieval motte-and-bailey castle on the border of Dunham Massey and Bowdon. It is listed as a Scheduled Ancient Monument. The motte and surrounding ditch still survives, although it had fallen out of use by the 13th century.

Sport 

Trafford is the home of several major sports teams, including Manchester United Football Club and Lancashire County Cricket Club (LCCC). Manchester United began as Newton Heath L&YR F.C. in 1878. The team plays at Old Trafford football ground, which is sometimes used as a stadium for international matches. Manchester United have won the FA Cup 12 times and been the Premier League champions 13 times (since the league was formed 31 seasons ago) and were Football League champions seven times in the years prior to that. The club last won the Premier League in 2013. LCCC started as the Manchester Cricket Club, and represents the historic county of Lancashire. The club contested the original 1890 County Championship. Old Trafford Cricket Ground – Lancashire's home ground – stages international matches, including Test matches and One Day Internationals. The team has won the county championship eight times outright (with one shared) and were the county champions in 2011 – the county's first outright triumph since 1934, but were then relegated to the second division in 2012.

From 2006 until 2015, the borough was home to the  Manchester Phoenix, who played their home games at the Altrincham Ice Dome, and were active in both the Elite Ice Hockey League and the  English Premier Ice Hockey League. The club was formed in 2003 as the successor to Manchester Storm, and folded in early 2017 after playing home fixtures during 2015–2016 in Deeside  and Blackpool. They were one of the founder members of the Elite Ice Hockey League. In 2008–09 they finished sixth in the Elite Ice Hockey League. The Trafford Metros were the Phoenix's junior side and are also based at the Altrincham Ice Dome. The Phoenix were replaced by a new team bearing the Manchester Storm name, who took a spot in the Elite Ice Hockey League for the 2015–2016 season

Rugby Union side Sale Sharks were formerly based in Trafford. They now play at the AJ Bell Stadium in Salford, although their former home ground at Heywood Road in Sale is still used for training. Sale Sharks won the Guinness Premiership in 2006; in 2008–09 they finished fifth.

As well as being home to several clubs in the top echelon of their sports, Trafford plays host to smaller clubs, including Altrincham F.C., Flixton F.C., and Trafford F.C. Both Flixton F.C. and Trafford F.C. play in the North West Counties Football League Division One. Flixton F.C. was formed in 1960 and earned promotion to NWCFL Division One at the end of the 2006–07 season. Trafford F.C. was formed in 1990 and finished fifth in the 2006–07 season. Altrincham F.C. was founded in 1903 and plays in the Football Conference.

Within Trafford their two clubs that enter teams in both the Men's and Women's England Hockey Leagues – Brooklands, based in Sale and Bowdon.
 
In 2017, Trafford Pétanque became Trafford's first ever officially registered Pétanque club. Trafford Pétanque currently plays within the Northern Region of Pétanque England.

Education 

There are 73 primary schools in Trafford, 17 secondary and grammar schools, and 6 special schools. Trafford maintains a selective education system, with grammar schools, assessed by the 11-plus exam. Trafford College, a £29M "super college" in Stretford, is the only college of further education in Trafford. It was officially opened in 2008, following a merger between South Trafford College and North Trafford College. Overall, Trafford was ranked 2nd out of all of the local education authorities in National Curriculum assessment performance in 2014. Indeed, in 2014 Trafford was the first in the United Kingdom for Key Stage 2 results, with 87% of Year 6 pupils achieving the expected standard of Level 4 or above in Reading, Writing and Arithmetic. Also in 2014 2nd for both GCSE and A-Level results, with 72.2% of Year 11 pupils achieving the expected standard or above of 5 GCSEs including English and Maths. For A-Level results 25% of students gained 3  A-Levels at grades A*-A, which is twice the national average, whilst 33% gained 3 A-levels at grades A*-B.

Trafford has 7 Grammar schools and all 7 are in the top 10 best performing state schools in Greater Manchester.

Religion 

At the 2001 UK census, 75.8% of Trafford's residents reported themselves as being Christian, 3.3% Muslim, 1.1% Jewish, 0.6% Hindu, 0.2% Buddhist and 0.5% Sikh. The census recorded 12.0% as having no religion, 0.2% had an alternative religion and 6.4% did not state their religion. Trafford is covered by the Catholic Dioceses of Shrewsbury and Salford, and the Church of England Dioceses of Manchester and Chester.

There are two Grade I listed churches in Trafford: St. Werburgh's Church, in Warburton, is a timber framed church and dates back to at least the 14th century; All Saints' Church, in Urmston, was constructed in 1868 by E. W. Pugin, and is considered to be one of his best works. Of the 11 Grade II* listed buildings in Trafford, seven are churches: Hale Chapel in Hale; the Church of St John the Divine in Sale; Church of St Mary the Virgin in Bowdon; St. Martin's Church in Sale; St. Michael's Church in Flixton; St. Margaret's Church in Altrincham; St. George's Church in Carrington.

In 2007, the Church of Scientology bought the Old Trafford Essence Distillery on Chester Road for a reported £3.6M. The Church stated that it had plans to turn the  Victorian building into a place of worship and religious instruction. The original plans were rejected by Trafford Council, but the Church stated its intention to revise the proposals and resubmit.

Transport 

Manchester Metrolink runs north–south through Trafford, with its southern terminus in Altrincham. Trams run on two routes: Altrincham to Piccadilly and Altrincham to Bury.  It serves Cornbrook, Trafford Bar, Old Trafford, Stretford, Dane Road, Sale, Brooklands, Timperley, Navigation Road and Altrincham. The line opened in 1992 and replaced the Manchester, South Junction and Altrincham Railway.

The other railway in Trafford is the Liverpool – Manchester via Warrington Central line, built by the Cheshire Lines Committee. The  Trafford Park Euroterminal rail freight terminal was opened in 1993. It cost £11 million and has the capacity to deal with 100,000 containers a year.

The council is responsible for the maintenance of Trafford's public roads and pavements.  Part of the M60 orbital motorway passes through Trafford, from junctions 6–10 inclusive.

A range of bus services provide connections between various towns in the borough and links to the city centre, and other urban areas of Greater Manchester and Cheshire. Operators include Stagecoach Manchester, Arriva North West, First Greater Manchester and some smaller operators, who generally run services under contract to Transport for Greater Manchester. Trafford Cycle Forum was established to promote cycling in Trafford; the group actively campaigns to raise money for cycling in the borough.

Freedom of the Borough
Sir Alex Ferguson and 207 (Manchester) Field Hospital, 2nd Medical Brigade, Royal Army Medical Corps (Army Reserve) received the Freedom of the Borough of Trafford on 14 October 2013 and 21 June 2011, respectively.

References

Bibliography

External links 

 www.trafford.gov.uk, Trafford Council.
 www.trafford.nhs.uk, Trafford NHS website.

Video clips 
 Trafford Council YouTube channel

 
 
Districts of England established in 1974
Metropolitan boroughs of Greater Manchester